Paul G. Copenhaver (September 3, 1941 – April 26, 2014) was an American politician who served in the Iowa House of Representatives from 1982 to 1985.

He died of bladder cancer on April 26, 2014, in Washington, D.C. at age 72.

References

1941 births
2014 deaths
Democratic Party members of the Iowa House of Representatives